Harold George may refer to:

 Harold Huston George (1892–1942), USAAF Brigadier General
 Harold L. George (1893–1986), USAAF Lieutenant General, Hughes Aircraft executive
 Harold Wesley George (1887–1915), Australian rugby union player

See also